The National Library of Myanmar, located in Yankin Township, Yangon, is the national library of Myanmar. Established in 1952, the National Library, along with Yangon University Library, is one of only two research libraries in Yangon. The library houses more than 220,000 books, divided into 10 sections.

Its collection used to have about 618,000 books and periodicals as well as 15,800 rare and valuable manuscripts. However, in 2006, the military government announced a plan to move a large part of its collection to a new National Library in Nay Pyi Taw, and to auction off its 8-story building and  lot in Tamwe Township. In October 2008, the National Library was moved to its current location.

The library's current collection of ancient Burmese texts includes 16,066 palm-leaf inscriptions, 1972 parabaik (folded writing tablets made of paper, cloth or metal), and 345 handwritten scripts of famous writers. The library's preservation and conservation section, established in 1993, regularly maintains rare Burmese manuscripts. The library plans to offer an online catalogue.

The National Library is a member of the International Federation of Library Associations and Institutions and National Libraries Group-Southeast Asia.

History
The National Library originated from the Bernard Free Library, which opened in 1883 during the British colonial era. The Bernard Library was renamed the State Library under the management of the Ministry of Culture in 1952, and changed its name to the National Library in 1967. The library was first located in the Jubilee Hall building, then moved to Pansodan Road, then relocated to its penultimate home in Tamwe, and finally moved to its present location in Yankin in October 2008.

References

Libraries in Myanmar
Myanmar
Government agencies established in 1952
Buildings and structures in Yangon
Libraries established in 1952
Library buildings completed in 2008
1952 establishments in Burma